St Mary's Cathedral Church, also known as St Mary's Church, is the former cathedral church of the Anglican Diocese of Auckland. Located in Parnell, it replaced the earlier Old St Mary's. This wooden Gothic Revival church was designed by the prominent Christchurch architect Benjamin Mountfort and completed in 1897. The building served as the cathedral church and principal Anglican church of Auckland until 1973 when the chancel of Holy Trinity Cathedral, for which the foundation stone was laid in 1957, came into use. In 1982, St Mary's Church was moved across Parnell Road to its present site beside the cathedral.

History

The original church, which came to be known as Old St Mary's, was built in 1860. The foundation stone for the current church was laid in 1886. At more than 50 metres long, it is the largest wooden Gothic church in the world. Its English-born architect, Benjamin Mountfort, had become one of New Zealand's most eminent architects, responsible for many of the Gothic Revival buildings in Christchurch. St Mary's is generally regarded as the most impressive of his wooden church designs.

The original intention had been to build the church in stone, but the plan had been rejected as too expensive. Mountfort seems to have ignored the perishable and limited qualities of wood, and built a vast church worthy of the finest stone.

Bishop William Cowie instigated the decision to make St Mary's the cathedral church during 1887, and the first part of the church, consisting of the chancel and three bays of the nave was consecrated and used from 1888.

The church was completed to its present state by the addition of the four final bays and consecrated in 1898. It was Mountfort's final large-scale work.

Externally the most noticeable architectural features of the long rectangular building are the numerous gables of the mostly single-story structure. The gables, often placed above lancet shaped windows, serve to accentuate the Gothic motifs. This is particularly evident on the exterior of the altar tribune where three tall narrow windows rise up into the gables themselves, the tribune itself is three sided, the wooden construction making the traditional Romanesque curve in stone impossible.

The opposing end of the church containing the principal entrance, displays the full height of the building with one large gable, containing not only ground floor windows but two levels of clerestory windows above. The gable here slopes at two angles. The architect's reasoning for this was to increase the height of the gable at the façade's centre, rather than allow it to rise uniformly according to the width of the building. This central steeper roof pitch increased the ceiling height to the central aisle, as would be found over the central aisle of a true Gothic cathedral. However, the resultant effect has been to create a gable which appears as though designed to bear the weight of heavy snow falls. In an area where snow does not occur this gives the façade, with its protruding decorated architrave above the first clerestory, an almost whimsical Swiss chalet atmosphere, which adds greatly to the building's individuality. Almost a hundred years later this feature was subtly suggested in the corresponding roofline of the new cathedral nave.

In 1982 St Mary's Church was moved into the precinct of the Cathedral of the Holy Trinity, a major feat of engineering when the church was transported across the road and turned through 90° onto its present site.

Heritage registration
St Mary's Cathedral Church was registered by the New Zealand Historic Places Trust as a Category I building on 26 November 1981 with registration number 21.

Google 360-degree interactive virtual tour
Click to see inside St Mary's Cathedral Church.
Click to walk and see inside St Mary's Cathedral

References

Mary's Cathedral
Auckland
Heritage New Zealand Category 1 historic places in the Auckland Region
Churches completed in 1897
Benjamin Mountfort church buildings
Listed churches in New Zealand
1890s architecture in New Zealand
Gothic Revival church buildings in New Zealand
Romanesque architecture in New Zealand
Parnell, New Zealand